Jeremy Williams (born August 19, 1972) is an American former professional boxer and mixed martial artist. He challenged once for the WBO heavyweight title in 1996.

Amateur career
As an amateur, he was the 1989 and 1990 United States amateur Light Heavyweight 1989 heavyweight Jr. Olympic champion and the 1990 and 1991 National Golden Gloves Light Heavyweight champion, and is a member of the Golden Gloves hall of fame.
He was a bronze medalist in the 1990 Goodwill Games in the 81 kg division, being knocked out cold with a right cross thrown by the Soviet Andrey Kurnyavka in the quarterfinals after a three-round slugfest (Kurnyavka later told that this was the toughest of his 350 fights.) At the 1991 match-up he was again knocked out cold in the 3rd round via left hook by the Soviet Sergey Klokov. Williams said in an interview to ESPN that the 1990 knockout loss "affected him for years after."

Amateur accomplishments
1990 Blue and Gold National Light Heavyweight Champion
1990 USA National Light Heavyweight Champion
1991 USA National Light Heavyweight Champion
1989 the world record fastest knockout 8 seconds
California state record fastest Knock out 10 seconds
His amateur record was 168–4. He dropped decisions to Montell Griffin in the Olympic qualifiers 1992.

Professional boxing career
Jeremy Williams is known in the boxing world as one of the most feared knockout artists in the Heavyweight division of his time, with two of his 35 knockouts coming before 30 seconds of the first round—he KO'd Arthur Weathers in 8 seconds on March 19, 1996 (the fastest KO in California boxing history) and KO'd Louis Monaco 28 seconds into their second meeting on March 17, 2002 (Williams had knocked Monaco out in 3 rounds 6 years earlier). Williams won the WBC Continental Americas Heavyweight Title twice.

Williams fought his professional debut at cruiserweight, before moving up to the heavyweight division for the rest of his career.

Williams always seemed to be on the cusp of attaining greatness, but his only challenge was for the WBO World title.

Williams quickly grabbed the attention of the former team that planned the road for Mike Tyson, Bill Cayton and Kevin Rooney. Williams relocated to Catskill, New York. He won his first five fights by KO.
While on the rise as a young pro, Williams defeated another undefeated prospect out of Detroit's Kronk Gym, Danell Nicholson. Going into the fight many writers believed that Nicholson (who was managed and trained by Emmanuel Stewert) would pick apart the smaller Williams. Williams ripped Nicholson up in the first round and finished him in the 2nd round. A ferocious puncher who was of mixed blood.(Irish & African American; Dempsey Irish & Cherokee)He racked up a record of 15–0 before his first loss, via majority decision to Larry Donald. After the loss, Williams reeled off another streak of knockouts, and wound up facing Henry Akinwande for the WBO Heavyweight Title. Williams lost by KO in the 3rd round. Akinwande was much too big for Williams. It would appear, in retrospect, that Williams manager and father, Charlie, pushed Jeremy into the heavyweight division too soon and Akinwande capitalized on the much smaller and outclassed Williams. It is thought that this premature push into the heavyweight division (with Williams taking the fight on short notice) resulted in squashing Williams's dreams for ever claiming a heavyweight title. He then began a new streak of KO victories but in fighting for the lightly regarded IBC heavyweight crown Williams lost by TKO to Denmark's Brian Nielsen. There was some controversy surrounding the fight after Williams suffered from food poisoning after dining with the promoter the night before the bout. Some insiders have said that Williams was purposely poisoned. After another streak of knockouts he again was defeated this time by decision by perennial spoiler Maurice Harris.  In 2003 he upset heavyweight prospect Andre Purlette by decision.  Williams also competed Cedric Kushner's Thunderbox Heavyweight Tournament, "Fistful of Dollars", but lost on a 3-round decision that doesn't count on his record.

Williams latest run towards a heavyweight title shot ended when he went up against power punching Sam Peter, who ended Williams' night quickly with a vicious KO in the second round. In 2007 Williams re-entered boxing as a cruiserweight and won his first fight by split decision over Gary Gomez.

Professional boxing record

Television and film career
In 2005, he assisted the reality TV show The Contender as a trainer for the West Coast Team. In 2006, he again appeared on the show, Contender Season 2, as a trainer. Williams also starred in the film Carman: The Champion.  He is also the bully trainer on the MTV reality show, Bully Beatdown.

Mixed martial arts career
In 2005, he made his MMA debut at WFC: Rumble At the Ramada, defeating Josh Tamsen via TKO in the first round. He has since gone 5–0 with his latest win coming via way of TKO over Auggie Padeken on March 15, 2008.

Mixed martial arts record

|-
|Win
|align=center|5–0
| Auggie Padeken
|TKO (punches)
|Icon Sport-Baroni vs Hose
|
|align=center|1
|align=center|2:18
|Honolulu, Hawaii, United States
|
|-
|Win
|align=center|4–0
| Charles Jones
|TKO (exhaustion)
|Icon Sport-Epic
|
|align=center|3
|align=center|1:22
|Honolulu, Hawaii, United States
|
|-
|Win
|align=center|3–0
| Derek Thornton
|Submission (guillotine choke)
|Icon Sport-All In
|
|align=center|1
|align=center|3:48
|Honolulu, Hawaii, United States
|
|-
|Win
|align=center|2–0
| Ron Fields
|Submission (punches)
|Icon Sport-Mayhem vs Trigg
|
|align=center|2
|align=center|0:37
|Honolulu, Hawaii, United States
|
|-
|Win
|align=center|1–0
| Josh Tamsen
|TKO 
|WFC-Rumble at the Ramada
|
|align=center|1
|align=center|0:00
|Norwalk, California, United States
|
|-

References

External links

1972 births
American male mixed martial artists
Boxers from Iowa
Cruiserweight boxers
Heavyweight boxers
Light heavyweight mixed martial artists
Mixed martial artists utilizing boxing
Living people
Mixed martial artists from Iowa
National Golden Gloves champions
Winners of the United States Championship for amateur boxers
Sportspeople from Fort Dodge, Iowa
American male boxers
Goodwill Games medalists in boxing
Competitors at the 1990 Goodwill Games